The glowlight rasbora (Trigonostigma hengeli) is a species of cyprinid fish in the genus Trigonostigma.

References 

 

Trigonostigma
Cyprinid fish of Asia
Freshwater fish of Indonesia
Taxa named by Herman Meinken
Fish described in 1956